Camilla and Camila are given names for females. They originate as the feminine of camillus, a term for a youth serving as acolyte in the ritual of ancient Roman religion, which may be of Etruscan origin. Kamilla/Kamila are similar names.

Hypocorisms of the name include Milly, Millie, and Milla.

History
The name Camillo is the Italian male version of Camilla.
Camillus came to be used as a cognomen in Rome, and Camilla would be the feminine form of this cognomen from a period when cognomina had become hereditary clan names. 
The most notable bearer of this name in Roman history is Marcus Furius Camillus (c. 446 – 365 BC), who according to Livy and Plutarch,   triumphed four times, was five times dictator, and was honoured with the title of "Second Founder of Rome".
In the Aeneid, Camilla was the name of a queen of the Volsci who was given as a servant to the goddess Diana and raised as a "warrior virgin" of the Amazon type.

In the English-speaking world, the name was popularized by Fanny Burney's novel Camilla of 1796.

The name, with the spelling Camila, has been particularly popular among Spanish speakers. Camila was among the five most popular names for Hispanic newborn girls in the American state of Virginia in 2022.

People with the given name Camilla

 Camilla Martelli (c. 1545–1590), first the lover and then the second wife of Cosimo I de' Medici, Grand Duke of Tuscany
 Camilla Dufour (17??-1846), British singer, writer and teacher of chess
 Camilla Collett (1813–1895), Norwegian writer and feminist
 Camilla Eibenschütz (1884–1958), German stage actress
 Camilla Odhnoff (1928–2013), Swedish politician
 Camilla Sparv (b. 1943), Swedish actress
 Camilla, Queen consort of the United Kingdom (born 1947), wife of King Charles III
 Camilla Rothe (b. 1947), German physician and tropical medicine specialist
 Lady Camilla Osborne (born 1950), only child of the 11th Duke of Leeds
 Camilla Scott (b. 1962), Canadian actress and television host
 Camilla Henemark (born 1964), Swedish singer
 Camilla Søeberg (b. 1966), Danish actress
 Camilla Cavendish, Baroness Cavendish of Little Venice (born 1968), British journalist and former policy advisor
 Camilla Bloch (born 1970), British barrister
 Princess Camilla, Duchess of Castro (born 1971), Italian philanthropist and humanitarian
 Camilla Dallerup (born 1974), British-based Danish ballroom dancer
 Camilla Läckberg, (born 1974), Swedish author
 Camilla Martin (b. 1974), retired badminton player from Denmark
 Camilla Franks (b. 1976), Australian fashion designer
 Camilla Rutherford (b. 1976), English actress and fashion model.
 Camilla Long (born 1978), British journalist for The Sunday Times
 Camilla Tominey (born 1978), British journalist
 Camilla Filippi (born 1979), Italian film, stage and television actress
 Camilla D'Errico (born 1980), Italian-Canadian visual artist
 Camilla Arfwedson (born 1981), British actress 
 Camilla Luddington (b. 1983), British actress.
 Camilla Marie Beeput (born 1984),  British singer
 Camilla Belle (born 1986), American actress
 Camilla Poindexter (born 1986), American reality television personality and model
 Camilla Kerslake (born c. 1988), English mezzo-soprano
 Millie Brady (born 1993), British actress

People with the given name Camila

 Camila Batmanghelidjh (born 1963), British businesswoman, founder and chief executive of mismanaged and defunct charity Kids Company
 Camila Pitanga (born 1977), Brazilian film and television actress
 Camila Alves (born 1982), Brazilian-American model and designer
 Camila Bordonaba (born 1984), Argentinian actress and musician
 Camila Brait (born 1988), Brazilian volleyball player
 Camila Cabello (born 1997), Cuban-American singer-songwriter and former Fifth Harmony member
 Camila María Concepción (1991-2020), American screenwriter and transgender rights activist
 Camila Giorgi (born 1991), Italian tennis player
 Camila Silva (tennis) (born 1992), Chilean tennis player
 Camila Vezzoso (born 1993), Uruguayan model crowned Miss Uruguay 2012
 Camila Mendes (born 1994), Brazilian-American actress
 Camila Martins Pereira (born 1994), Brazilian footballer
 Camila Silva (singer) (born 1994), Chilean singer-songwriter
 Camila Rossi (born 1999), Brazilian rhythmic gymnast

People with the given name Ćamila

 Ćamila Mičijević (born 1994), Bosnian-Croatian handball player

People with the given name Kimila

 Kimila Ann Basinger (born 1953), American actress

Fictional characters
 Camilla (muppet), a Muppet character
 Camilla (Castlevania), one of Dracula's servants in the Castlevania series
 Camila Canales (Spanish spelling), Protagonist’s love interest and General Canales's daughter in the novel El Señor Presidente by Guatemalan author diplomat Miguel Ángel Asturias 
 Camilla Gevert, fictional character in the Bert Diaries
 Camilla Macaulay, fictional character in the novel The Secret History
 Camilla, a character in Fire Emblem Fates
 Camila Vargas, a character on Queen of the South
 Camilla "Cam" Lawson, in the Jacqueline Wilson book and TV series The Story Of Tracy Beaker
Camila Torres, a character in the Argentine telenovela Violetta
Camilla Lollia, a character in The Elder Scrolls IV: Oblivion
Camilla Valerius, a character in The Elder Scrolls V: Skyrim
Camilla, an orange Chocobo from the Chocobo series

See also
 Camila (disambiguation)
 Camilla (disambiguation)
 Camille (disambiguation)

References

Feminine given names